Sagan is a 2008 French biographical film, directed by Diane Kurys, starring Sylvie Testud as French author Françoise Sagan and Pierre Palmade as a dancer and a society man, Jacques Chazot, who was very well known in France. The film starts in the mid-1950s as Sagan (then still known under her real name Quoirez) closes a publishing deal for her controversial debut novel Bonjour Tristesse.

The film then follows Sagan's road to fame, her drug abuse, alcoholism, and gambling, her hedonistic lifestyle spending too much and becoming poor, as well as several complex love affairs with both men and women.

Cast 
 Sylvie Testud - Françoise Sagan
 Pierre Palmade - Jacques Chazot
 Jeanne Balibar - Peggy Roche
 Arielle Dombasle - Astrid
 Lionel Abelanski - Bernard Frank
 Guillaume Gallienne - Jacques Quoirez
 Denis Podalydès - Guy Schoeller
 Bruno Wolkowitch - Philippe
 Chantal Neuwirth - Madame Lebreton
 Alexis Michalik - Denis Westhoff

Awards and nominations
César Awards (France)
Nominated: Best Actress – Leading Role (Sylvie Testud)
Nominated: Best Actress – Supporting Role (Jeanne Balibar)
Nominated: Best Costume Design (Nathalie du Roscoat)

References

External links

2008 films
2000s French-language films
2000s biographical films
French biographical films
Biographical films about writers
2000s French films